Rad Girls was a stunt and prank television show which aired on the music network Fuse TV and then on MavTV. The show's format was essentially a female version of MTV's Jackass, with three female performers: Ramona Cash, Munchie, and Darling Clementine, doing stunts and pranks that involve disgusting food, bodily excretions, and debauchery.

According to the trio's MySpace page, Fuse decided to change format to exclusively music-based programming, thus not renewing Rad Girls for a second season.  Over 4,000 ardent fans of Rad Girls signed an online petition ("Bring Back the Rad Girls!") to get the show back on the air, but their contract with Fuse ended in February 2008. Rad Girls Season 2 premiered on November 7, 2008 on MavTV, an HD network oriented towards male viewers.

The program has also aired internationally, on five continents: Australia (XYZ Networks), New Zealand (C4 New Zealand), Canada (Alliance Atlantis Broadcasting Inc.), UK (MTV Networks Europe), South Africa (M-Net), Brazil (Globosat), and Korea (Dong ah TV).

Episodes

Season one

Season two

See also

 Dirty Sanchez
 The Dudesons
 Jackass
 The Janoskians
 The Mad Hueys
 The Single Life with Sam Phillips (Rad Girls featured in MavTV Episode 5)
 Tokyo Shock Boys
 Too Stupid to Die

References

External links

 Archive of Fox News’ American Newsroom
 Archive of H Magazine, November 2008
 YRB Magazine, "The Fight Issue," April 2009
 Archive of official website
 Archive of Rad Girls at MavTV.com
 Radgirls at Fuse.tv
 

2000s American reality television series
2007 American television series debuts
2008 American television series endings
Fuse (TV channel) original programming
Television series by Entertainment One
Television shows set in Los Angeles